Khuda Kay Liye (also released as In the Name of God in international markets) is a 2007 Pakistani drama film directed by Shoaib Mansoor, produced by Brigadier Syed Mujtaba Tirmizi from ISPR and stars Shaan Shahid, Fawad Khan and Iman Ali in pivotal roles, with a cameo appearance by Naseeruddin Shah. The film follows Mansoor and Sarmad (played by Shaan and Khan), two singers whose lives change after the events of 9/11 attacks in America and misinterpreted teachings of Jihad.

Khuda Kay Liye was released on 20 July 2007 in Pakistan and on 4 April 2008 in India, as well as the screenings at various international film festivals. The film subsequently won a number of awards for its acting, notably three Lux Style Awards, one Silver Pyramid Award at Cairo International Film Festival. The release of the film was historic for two reasons: due to distribution by Shailendra Singh and Percept Pictures, it was the first Pakistani film to be released in India in almost half a century, and secondly it was the first ever Pakistani film to be included in the official selection of the International Film Festival of India (IFFI).

Plot
Brothers Mansoor and Sarmad are two successful singers from Lahore. Sarmad eventually is influenced by an Islamic activist Maulana Tahiri, as he begins to practice a more conservative Islamic way of living and gives up his music career as it is considered "haram" by the Islamic activist. Maryam (Mary), a westernised British Pakistani girl, falls in love with Dave from the British community. However this displeases her father, who is hypocritical, despite himself being in a live-in relationship with a British woman.

Meanwhile, Mary's father plans to take her for a trip to Pakistan to meet Sarmad and Mansoor. During the visit, she is deceived by her father and taken across the border to Afghanistan under the guise of attending a relative's wedding. In Afghanistan, she is forcefully married off to her cousin Sarmad and abandoned in their household. In an escape attempt, Mary tries to run from the village but gets caught by Sarmad. He eventually rapes her, as advised by the maulana, as a sort of punishment so that Mary would not escape again. Mary becomes pregnant and has a baby, thus lowering her chances to escape.

Simultaneously, Mansoor goes to a musical school in Chicago, where he meets fellow music student Janie. They fall in love with each other and Janie stops drinking alcohol for him. They eventually marry. However, shortly after the events of 9/11, Mansoor gets arrested by the FBI due to his Islamic background and is detained and tortured for a year in Guantanamo Bay detention camp.

Mary is rescued by Sarmad's father under the protection of the British government. A devastated Mary takes her father and cousin to court in Pakistan for justice. Wali (Naseeruddin Shah), a Maulana, then explains to the court how Islam is being misused in the name of war and hatred, bringing the religion forward in a believable and peaceful manner. Traumatised by all the suffering he has seen and caused, Sarmad withdraws the case. He also realizes the damage that he was made to inflict in the name of religion. Mary is now free and returns to the village where she was kept prisoner so she can educate the girls there. Meanwhile, Mansoor is still in FBI custody after a year of torment; the last torture session having inflicted permanent brain damage. After a failed rehab attempt, he is deported and reunited with his family in Pakistan where he begins to recover.

Cast
 Shaan - Mansoor
 Fawad Khan - Sarmad
 Iman Ali - Maryam (Mary)
 Naseeruddin Shah - Maulana Wali (Special Appearance)
 Naeem Tahir - Mansoor's & Sarmad's Father
 Rasheed Naz - Maulana Tahirih
 Hameed Sheikh - Sher Shah 
 Sonia Rehman as Khala
 Humayun Kazmi - Mary's Father
 Austin Marie Sayre - Janie
 Seemi Raheel - Mansoor's & Sarmad's Mother

Production

Development

Shoaib Mansoor, the director of the film, developed the idea after the misconceptions about Pakistan in Pakistani diaspora and India. Mansoor stated that the film will clear the irrelevant thinking of Indians towards the Pakistani community.

Filming

Principal photography of the film took place in Lahore, where most of the parts were filmed. Besides, the film was also shot at Chicago, London and Khyber Pakhtunkhwa.

Box office 
Khuda Kay Liye is one of Pakistan's highest-grossing films, with a domestic gross of PKR 11.1 million and a worldwide gross of PKR 210million.

Music

The music of the film was released on July 7, 2007. The soundtrack album of the film was composed and produced by Rohail Hyatt. All songs were written by Shoaib Mansoor with an exception of "Mahi Way" and "Bandeya".

Accolades

See also
 List of highest-grossing Pakistani films
 List of Pakistani films of 2007
List of cultural references to the September 11 attacks

References

External links

 
 
 

Pakistani drama films
Films based on the September 11 attacks
2000s Urdu-language films
2007 films
English-language Pakistani films
Films shot in Chicago
Films directed by Shoaib Mansoor
Films set in London
Films set in Lahore
Films shot in Khyber Pakhtunkhwa
2007 drama films
Lollywood films
Films directed by Bilal Lashari
Geo Films films
Films about Islam